The U.S. state of Oklahoma has 77 counties. It is ranked 20th in size and 17th in the number of counties, between Mississippi with 82 counties and Arkansas with 75 counties.

Oklahoma originally had seven counties (Logan, Cleveland, Oklahoma, Canadian, Kingfisher, Payne, and Beaver) when it was first organized as the Oklahoma Territory. These counties were designated numerically, first through seventh. New counties added after this were designated by letters of the alphabet. The first seven counties were later renamed. The Oklahoma Constitutional Convention named all of the counties that were formed when Oklahoma entered statehood in 1907. Only two counties have been formed since then. Upon statehood, all Oklahoma counties allowed civil townships within their counties. A few years after statehood, a constitutional amendment allowed them to be abolished on a county-by-county basis, and by the mid-1930s, all Oklahoma counties had voted to do so.

According to the Oklahoma Constitution, a county can be disorganized if the sum of all taxable property is less than $2.5 million. If so, then a petition must be signed by one-fourth of the population and then a vote would occur. If a majority votes for dissolution of the county, the county will be combined with an adjacent county with the lowest valuation of taxable property.

The Federal Information Processing Standard (FIPS) code, which is used by the United States government to uniquely identify counties, is provided with each entry. The FIPS code for each county links to census data for that county.

The area in these tables is land area, and does not include water area.

Oklahoma's postal abbreviation is OK and its FIPS state code is 40.

Alphabetical list

|}

See also
 Oklahoma
 County (United States)
 Lists of U.S. county name etymologies

References

Oklahoma, counties in
 
Counties